Pantilema is a monotypic beetle genus in the family Cerambycidae described by Per Olof Christopher Aurivillius in 1911. Its single species, Pantilema angustum, was described by the same author in the same year.

References

Morimopsini
Beetles described in 1911
Monotypic beetle genera